Wonder Boy for President is a 2016 South-African mockumentary directed by John Barker. The world premiere took place 17 June 2016 at the Durban International Film Festival.

Plot
The movie describes a young man from South Africa who is influenced by a group of corrupt people to run for president.

Cast
 Kagiso Lediga 
 Tony Miyambo 
 Ntosh Madlingozi 
 Thishiwe Ziqubu 
 Zabalaza Sicelakuye Mchunu 
 Lara Lipschitz 
 David Kibuuka 
 John Vlismas 
 Loyiso Gola 
 Mary Twalai
 Kevin Zinter
 Bryan van Niekerk 
 Akin Omotoso 
 John Barker 
 Tshepo Mogale 
 Christopher Steenkamp

References

2016 films
2010s mockumentary films
Political mockumentaries
2016 comedy films
South African comedy films
English-language South African films
2010s English-language films